Heroes of the West (1932) is a Universal Pre-Code movie serial that depicts the dangers and thrills of building a transcontinental railroad. This was the 82nd serial (and the 14th serial with sound) to be released by Universal. It was remade in 1938 as Flaming Frontiers (serial).

Plot overview
John Blaine – helped by his teenaged son and daughter, Noah and Ann – work to build a section of a transcontinental railroad "through the heart of the wild and wooly west." Their section threads through Wyoming territory, dangerously close to hostile Indians. In addition to tribulations inherent in the Old West, work is hindered by crooked foreman Rance Judd, who is "secretly in the pay of a rival contractor and aims to make Blaine lose his government railroad contract by fouling up construction in any way he can" with help from his henchmen Butch Gore, Bart Eaton, and Buckskin Joe. Blaine is aided by a group of men also working on the railroad: surveyor Tom Crosby, scout Noah Blaine, and rail crew leader Bart Eaton. Together, our heroes must battle skullduggery from Judd's henchmen, stagecoach problems, saloon brawls, horse stampedes, train robberies, Indian attacks, and other perils "to complete the line on time."

As is typical in serial films, each episode ends on a cliff-hanger. For example: after a tremendous fight in an old trapper's cabin, the cabin catches on fire and burns down with our heroes still inside; however, the next episode shows how they escaped the fire through a secret tunnel in the cabin floor.

Cast
 Noah Beery Jr. as Noah Blaine
 Julie Bishop as Ann Blaine (as Diane Duval)
 Onslow Stevens as Tom Crosby
 William Desmond as John Blaine
 Martha Mattox as Aunt Martha
 Philo McCullough as Rance Judd
 Harry Tenbrook as Butch Gore
 Frank Lackteen as Buckskin Joe
 Edmund Cobb as Bart Eaton
 Francis Ford as a Cavalry Captain

Production
Along with Flaming Frontiers (1938), this serial was based on The Tie That Binds by Peter B. Kyne. Heroes of the West was Universal's 82nd serial. In terms of Universal's serials in the sound era, it was the 14th. See the list of film serials by studio for more information about other serials of the time. Much of the material was reused in Universal's 1942 serial Overland Mail starring Lon Chaney Jr.

Heroes of the West was directed by prolific film director Ray Taylor.

Chapter titles
 Blazing the Trail
 Red Peril
 The Avalanche
 A Shot from the Dark
 The Holdup
 Captured by Indians
 Flaming Arrows
 Frontier Justice
 The Iron Monster
 Thundering Death
 Thundering Hoofs 
 The End of the Trail
Source:

The 12 chapters ran for a total series screen time of 225 minutes.

See also
 List of American films of 1932
 List of film serials by year
 List of film serials by studio

References

External links

1932 films
1932 Western (genre) films
American black-and-white films
1930s English-language films
Films directed by Ray Taylor
Universal Pictures film serials
Films based on American novels
Films based on Western (genre) novels
American Western (genre) films
Rail transport films
1930s American films